Kobresia simpliciuscula is a species of sedge known by the common names false sedge, simple bog sedge and simple kobresia. It has a circumpolar distribution, occurring throughout the northern latitudes of the Northern Hemisphere.

This perennial plant forms tufts of several triangular stems reaching up to 50 centimeters in height. It has short rhizomes. The leaves are up to 20 centimeters long. The inflorescence contains up to 12 spikes of flowers. Light is required for the seeds to germinate.

This plant occurs on tundra and in alpine climates. It grows in wet habitat types such as ponds and meadows. It often grows in calcareous substrates such as limestone.

References

External links

Cyperaceae
Flora of Subarctic America
Flora of Russia
Plants described in 1803
Taxa named by Kenneth Kent Mackenzie